John Fay may refer to:
John Fay (American football) (1895–1983), American football player
John D. Fay (1815–1895), American civil engineer
John Fay (politician) (1773–1855), American politician
John J. Fay Jr. (1927–2003), American politician in New Jersey
John Fay (writer) (21st century), British television writer
John David Fay, mathematician, eponym of Fay's trisecant identity

See also
Johnny Fay, drummer for the band The Tragically Hip